Oconee Township may refer to one of the following places in the United States:

 Oconee Township, Shelby County, Illinois
 Oconee Township, Platte County, Nebraska